WMKV (89.3 FM) is a radio station in Reading, Ohio, United States, a suburb of Cincinnati. It is the first FM educational public radio station to be licensed to a retirement community and also streams live via webcast.  Operating from the campus of Maple Knoll Village, WMKV broadcasts talk programs, classic shows from the old-time radio era, and features musical standards and big band music. The station also carries the audio of WKRC-TV's morning and evening news. The station's transmitter has an effective radiated power of 410 watts.

Starting in July 2013, WMKV's programming has been also carried by Lakota Local School District's WLHS 89.9 FM. In addition to its streaming audio service, three WMKV programs are available as podcasts via iTunes: "WMKV World Front," "WMKV Computer Talk," and "The Big Broadcast."

History
WMKV has been broadcasting since 1995. It aired a revival of Moon River from 1995 to 1999. In 1999, WMKV took over 89.3 FM after Reading High School shut down its high school radio station, WRCJ.

In November 2004, WMKV was the subject of a front-page Los Angeles Times profile. The writer, P.J. Huffstutter, had discovered the station while reporting on the 2004 American presidential election from Ohio.

See also
List of community radio stations in the United States

External links
WMKV
Maple Knoll Village
LifeSphere
WMKV-FM adds simulcast on FM 89.9

MKV
Adult standards radio stations in the United States
Community radio stations in the United States
1995 establishments in Ohio